James Augustine (born February 27, 1984) is a retired American professional basketball player who played as a forward. During the career he played college basketball for the Illinois Fighting Illini before being drafted 41st overall in the 2006 NBA draft by the Orlando Magic. Later he relocated in Europe and concluded his playing career for Malaga. Augustine has played over 400 official games in different clubs.

Early life
Augustine was born in Midlothian, Illinois, but eventually moved to Mokena, Illinois, where he attended Lincoln-Way Central High School in New Lenox, Illinois where he graduated in 2002. While at Lincoln-Way, Augustine played both football and basketball.

College career
Augustine played for the University of Illinois men's basketball team from 2002 to 2006.  As a freshman, Augustine was a starter for a team that finished second in the Big Ten.  Playing both the power forward and center positions, his career with the Illini included many team records, a trip to the national championship game, and several awards including the Big Ten tournament Most Outstanding Player for his play in the 2005 Big Ten men's basketball tournament.  Throughout his college career, Augustine was often complimented by announcers for his athleticism for a big man.  Many attributed this ability to the fact that Augustine played Quarterback for his high school football team. Augustine is the first player in school history and just the 12th player in Big Ten history with 1,000 career points and 1,000 career rebounds. Augustine finished his college career with 1,383 points and 1,023 rebounds. He is also the school-record holder for career field goal percentage at 61.7 percent (534–865), which also ranks fifth in Big Ten history. Augustine Played in 137 games, starting 134 of them during his college career, the second most games played in school history (tied with Dee Brown).

Professional career
Augustine was selected with the 41st pick by the Orlando Magic in the 2006 NBA draft. In August 2008, after playing two seasons in the NBA and its affiliate Development League, Augustine signed with Gran Canaria of the Spanish league.

On July 30, 2010, he signed a one-year contract with Power Electronics Valencia.

In August 2011 he signed with UCAM Murcia.

In May 2012, he signed a contract with the Russian team Khimki.

On July 4, 2016, Augustine signed with CSKA Moscow. On July 8, 2017, CSKA announced the termination of their contract with Augustine.

On August 3, 2017, Augustine signed with Spanish club Unicaja for the 2017–18 season. After season he was released from the club.

Retirement
On 20 October 2019, at age 35, Augustine announced that he would retire from professional sport. “In summer I thought it was too much. Now I am enjoying life after active sport. I had a very long career," he said.

Augustine has expressed a desire to be a coach in the future.

Career statistics

NBA

Regular season

|-
| align="left" | 2006–07
| align="left" | Orlando
| 2 || 0 || 3.5 || .333 || .000 || .000 || 1.5 || 1.0 || .0 || .0 || 1.0
|-
| align="left" | 2007–08
| align="left" | Orlando
| 25 || 0 || 6.0 || .529 || .000 || .500 || 1.2 || .1 || .2 || .1 || 1.6
|- class="sortbottom"
| style="text-align:left;"| Career
| style="text-align:left;"| 
| 27 || 0 || 5.8 || .514 || .000 || .500 || 1.2 || .1 || .2 || .1 || 1.6

Playoffs

|-
| align="left" | 2008
| align="left" | Orlando
| 1 || 0 || 2.0 || 1.000 || .000 || .000 || 1.0 || .0 || .0 || .0 || 2.0
|- class="sortbottom"
| style="text-align:left;"| Career
| style="text-align:left;"|
| 1 || 0 || 2.0 || 1.000 || .000 || .000 || 1.0 || .0 || .0 || .0 || 2.0

EuroLeague

|-
| style="text-align:left;"|2010–11
| style="text-align:left;"|Valencia
| 8 || 2 || 14.7 || .500 || .000 || .500 || 3.1 || .5 || .3 || .1 || 3.4 || 4.3
|-
| style="text-align:left;"|2012–13
| style="text-align:left;"|Khimki
| 22 || 22 || 22.7 || .603 || .333 || .698 || 4.7 || 1.7 || .6 || .7 || 5.7 || 10.5
|-
| style="text-align:left;"|2015–16
| style="text-align:left;"|Khimki
| 23 || 17 || 27.5 || .688 || .375 || .600 || 6.7 || 1.7 || 1.0 || 1.0 || 11.0 || 16.8
|-
| style="text-align:left;"|2016–17
| style="text-align:left;"|CSKA Moscow
| 34 || 6 || 16.2 || .672 || .333 || .578 || 4.5 || .4 || .8 || .4 || 6.0 || 8.5
|-
| style="text-align:left;"|2017–18
| style="text-align:left;"|Unicaja
| 29 || 15 || 23.3 || .642 || .333 || .578 || style="background:#cfecec;"|6.7 || 1.4 || 1.0 || .5 || 9.2 || 14.4
|- class="ortbottom"
| style="text-align:left;"| Career
| style="text-align:left;"| 
| 116 || 62 || 21.4 || .645 || .227 || .607 || 5.4 || 1.2 || .8 || .6 || 7.6 || 11.7

Domestic leagues

Records and awards
Augustine holds the school record for career rebounds with 1,023. He became the first Fighting Illini player and the 12th player in Big Ten Conference history to accumulate 1,000 points and 1,000 rebounds. This feat was last accomplished Indiana's by Alan Henderson, who played from 1992 to 1995. Augustine holds the school record for career field goal percentage at 61.7 and shares the school award for career victories with Dee Brown, with 114 wins.

Augustine was also named Most Outstanding Player in the 2005 Big Ten tournament.

Before playing in a regular-season game with the Magic, Augustine was assigned to an affiliate NBA Development League team, the Anaheim Arsenal, in January 2007, appearing in 8 games and averaging 10 points and eight rebounds. He recorded 4 double-doubles in his 8 games. Augustine made his first appearance in a regular-season game on February 2, 2007, against the New Jersey Nets, recording two points, two assists, and three rebounds in four minutes of playing time.

Personal life
His uncle, Jerry Augustine, played professional baseball for the MLB's Milwaukee Brewers from 1975 to 1984 and was the head baseball coach at the University of Wisconsin–Milwaukee for the 1995–2006 seasons. Augustine is also the cousin of former NFL safety Nick Sorensen.

References

External links
 
 James Augustine at euroleague.net
 James Augustine at fightingIllini.com
 Draft Profile at NBA.com

1984 births
Living people
American expatriate basketball people in Russia
American expatriate basketball people in Spain
Anaheim Arsenal players
Baloncesto Málaga players
Basketball players from Illinois
BC Khimki players
CB Gran Canaria players
CB Murcia players
Centers (basketball)
Illinois Fighting Illini men's basketball players
Liga ACB players
Orlando Magic draft picks
Orlando Magic players
PBC CSKA Moscow players
People from Midlothian, Illinois
People from Mokena, Illinois
Power forwards (basketball)
Sportspeople from Cook County, Illinois
Valencia Basket players
American men's basketball players